Adam Ray is an American comedian, actor, voice-over artist, and YouTuber.

Early life
Ray was raised in Seattle and attended Shorecrest High School. He earned a Bachelor of Fine Arts degree from University of Southern California.

Career
Ray joined the YouTube community as "adamraycomedy" and has 20 thousand subscribers with more than eight million views. His voice has been featured in advertisements for McDonald's, Hyundai, Brooks Brothers, the San Diego Zoo, and Burger King.

Filmography

Film

Television

Video games

References

External links
 

21st-century American male actors
American male comedians
American male film actors
American male television actors
American male comedy actors
Living people
Year of birth missing (living people)
Actors from Seattle
Actors from Washington (state)
Male actors from Washington (state)
University of Southern California alumni